Rethymno (also Rethimno, Rethymnon, Réthymnon, and Rhíthymnos) is a city in Greece on the island of Crete. It is the capital of Rethymno regional unit, and has a population of more than 30,000 inhabitants (near 40,000 for the municipal unit). 
 
Rethymno was originally built during the Minoan civilization (ancient Rhithymna and Arsinoe). The city was prominent enough to mint its own coins and maintain urban growth. One of these coins is today depicted as the crest of the town: two dolphins in a circle.

History 

This region as a whole is rich with ancient history, most notably through the Minoan civilisation centred at Knossos east of Rethymno. Rethymno itself began a period of growth when the Venetian conquerors of the island decided to put an intermediate commercial station between Heraklion and Chania, acquiring its own bishop and nobility in the process. Today's old town (palia poli) was almost entirely built by the Republic of Venice. It is one of the best-preserved old towns in Crete.

From circa 1250 the city was the seat of the Latin Diocese of Retimo, which was renamed Retimo–Ario after the absorption in 1551 of the Diocese of Ario and as suppressed only after the Turkish conquest.

The town still maintains its old aristocratic appearance, with its buildings dating from the 16th century, arched doorways, stone staircases, Byzantine and Hellenic-Roman remains, the small Venetian harbour and narrow streets. The Venetian Loggia houses the information office of the Ministry of Culture and Sports. A Wine Festival is held there annually at the beginning of July. Another festival, in memory of the destruction of the Arkadi Monastery, is held on 7–8 November.

The city's Venetian-era citadel, the Fortezza of Rethymno, is one of the best-preserved castles in Crete. Other monuments include the Neradje Mosque (the Municipal Odeon arts centre), the Great Gate ( or "Porta Guora"), the Piazza Rimondi and the Loggia.

The town was captured by the Ottoman Empire in 1646 during the Cretan War (1645–69) and they ruled it for almost three centuries. The town, called Resmo in Turkish, was the centre of a sanjak (administrative part of a province) during Ottoman rule.

During the Battle of Crete (20–30 May 1941), the Battle of Rethymno was fought between German paratroopers and the Second Australian Imperial Force and Hellenic Army. Although initially unsuccessful, the Germans won the battle after receiving reinforcements from Maleme in the Northwestern part of the island.

Today the city's main income is from tourism, many new facilities having been built in the past 20 years. Agriculture is also notable, especially for olive oil and other Mediterranean products.

Municipality 

The municipality of Rethymno was formed at the 2011 local government reform by the merger of the following 4 former municipalities, that became municipal units:
Arkadi
Lappa
Nikiforos Fokas
Rethymno

Population of Rethymno

Culture 

Rethymno is home to the following museums:
Archaeological Museum of Rethymno
Historical and Folklore Museum of Rethymno
Municipal Gallery "L. Kanakakis"
The Frantzeskaki Collection
Museum of Sea Life at Rethymno

The Treasure Hunt of Rethymno is a game played by local people and takes place two weeks before Carnival.

Literature 
Pandelis Prevelakis wrote Το χρονικό μιας πολιτείας (1937), The Chronicle of a Town, a nostalgic depiction of Rethymno from the period of the Cretan State (1898) to the expulsion of the Cretan Turks (1924).

Sports

Rethymno hosted the international athletics meeting known as Vardinogianneia. The athletics meeting stopped in 2012 due to Greek financial crisis. Rethymno has many sport clubs with presence in Panhellenic championships of various sports. Below is alist of the main sport clubs of Rethymno.

Education

In the Rethymno Campus of the University of Crete are located the School of Philosophy, the School of Education, the School of Social, Economics and Political Sciences, and the University Library of the University of Crete. On a yearly basis, there are about 8.000 students studying at "Galos" where the Campus and the Academic Institute of Mediterranean Studies are located. Also in Rethymnon is located the School of Music and Optoacoustic Technologies of the Hellenic Mediterranean University. Finally, in Rethymno, Tria Monastiria area is located the international research Institute of Plasma Physics and Laser of the Hellenic Mediterranean University which is the access point of the National Research Facility HELLAS-CH .

Geography

Climate

Notable locals 
 Royalty and politics
 Georgios Chortatzis (1545–1610), dramatist in Cretan verse
 Ahmed Resmî Efendi (1700–1783), Ottoman statesman, author and ambassador
 Nikolaos Sifounakis (born 1949), Greek politician
 Emetullah Rabia Gülnuş Sultan (1642–1715), valide sultan
 Emmanouil Tsouderos (1882-1956), former Prime Minister of Greece

 Other
Stylianos Harkianakis (1935 - 2019), Greek Orthodox Archbishop of Australia
 Athanasius III of Constantinople, Patriarch
 Pandelis Prevelakis (1909–1986), writer
 Manolis Xexakis (born 1949), poet and writer
 Nick Dandolos (1883–1966), professional poker player

International relations 

Rethymno is twinned with :
 Ayia Napa, Cyprus
 Castenaso, Italy
 Pushkin, Russia

Gallery

See also 
 History of Crete
 List of settlements in the Rethymno regional unit
 Rethymnian Brewery

References 
Notes

External links 

 http://www.explorerrethymno.gr
Prefecture of Rethymno - Official website
Rethymno The Official website of the Greek National Tourism Organisation

 
Mediterranean port cities and towns in Greece
Greek prefectural capitals
Populated places in Rethymno (regional unit)